Amlak (also Romanized as Amlāk) is a village in Jereh Rural District, Jereh and Baladeh District, Kazerun County, Fars Province, Iran. At the 2006 census, its population was 55, in 13 families.

References 

Populated places in Kazerun County